Mohd Fazliata bin Taib (born 10 December 1985, in Changlun, Kedah) is a Malaysian footballer who plays for Felcra in the Malaysia Premier League, primarily as a centre back but he is also capable of playing as a right full back when required.

References

1985 births
Living people
Malaysian footballers
Negeri Sembilan FA players
Association football defenders
People from Kedah